Giovanna of Savoy (Ioanna Savoiska) (13 November 1907 – 26 February 2000) was an Italian princess of the House of Savoy who later became the Tsaritsa of Bulgaria by marriage to Boris III of Bulgaria.

Early life

Giovanna was born in Rome, the third daughter and the fourth of five children of King Victor Emmanuel III of Italy and Queen Elena, former Princess of Montenegro. Upon her Roman Catholic christening, she was given the names Giovanna Elisabetta Antonia Romana Maria. Her older brother was the future (and last) Italian king Umberto II of Italy.

Tsaritsa of Bulgaria

Giovanna married Tsar Boris III of Bulgaria in the Basilica of St Francis of Assisi, Assisi in October 1930, in a Roman Catholic ceremony, attended by Italian dictator Benito Mussolini. Bulgarians deemed her a good match, partly because her mother, Elena of Montenegro, was of Slavic ethnicity.  At a second ceremony in Sofia, Giovanna (who herself was daughter of a Roman Catholic father and a formerly Orthodox mother) was married in an Eastern Orthodox Church ceremony, bringing her into conflict with the Roman Catholic Church.  Giovanna adopted the Bulgarian version of her name, Ioanna. Giovanna knew the Pope's Apostolic Visitor to Bulgaria, Archbishop Angelo Roncalli, the future Pope John XXIII who was able to help her.  She and Boris had two children: Marie Louise of Bulgaria, born in January 1933, and then the future Simeon II of Bulgaria in 1937.

In the years prior to World War II, Tsaritsa Ioanna became heavily involved in charities, including the financing of a children's hospital.  During the war she counterbalanced her husband consigning Bulgaria to the Axis by obtaining transit visas to enable a number of Jews to escape to Argentina. Tsar Boris also proved less malleable than Hitler had hoped, and following a meeting in Berlin in August 1943, the Tsar became seriously ill and died, aged 49. Stress and a heart condition were the official reasons for his death.

Ioanna's son, Simeon, became the new tsar and a regency was established, led by his uncle Prince Kyril, who was considered more pliable by the Germans.

In the dying days of the Second World War, Bulgaria was occupied by the Soviet Union. Prince Kyril was tried by a People's Court and subsequently executed.  Giovanna and her son Simeon remained under house arrest at Vrana Palace, near Sofia, until 15 September 1946, when the new Communist government gave them 48 hours to leave the country because the state was declared republic after a referendum, although the queen wanted to leave Bulgaria after the execution of Prince Kiril on 1 February 1945.

Late years

After initially fleeing to Alexandria in the Kingdom of Egypt, to join her father, King Victor Emmanuel III, they moved on to Madrid. In 1962 Simeon II married and Queen Giovanna moved to Estoril, on the Portuguese Riviera, where she lived for the rest of her life, apart from a brief return to Bulgaria in 1993, when she visited the site of Boris's grave and was present at the reburial of his heart.

She is buried in the Communal Cemetery of Assisi, Italy, where she had married King Boris III in 1930.

Honours

National
  House of Savoy: Knight Grand Cordon of the Order of Saints Maurice and Lazarus
 : Knight Grand Cross Honour and Devotion of the Sovereign Military Order of Malta, 3rd First Class
  Royal Family of Two Sicilies: Knight Grand Cross of the Royal Order of Francis I
  House of Saxe-Coburg-Gotha-Koháry: Knight Grand Cross of the Royal Order of Saint Alexander, in Diamonds, 1933

Foreign
  Austrian Imperial and Royal Family: Dame of the Imperial and Royal Order of the Starry Cross
  Bavarian Royal Family: Dame Grand Cross of the Royal Order of Theresa
  Russian Imperial Family: Dame Grand Cordon of the Imperial Order of Saint Catherine
  Yugoslavian Royal Family: Dame Grand Cross of the Royal Order of Saint Sava

Arms

Patronage
 : Patron of the 10th Cavalry regiment of Queen Ioanna

Ancestry

Sources

 Boris III of Bulgaria 1894–1943, by Pashanko Dimitroff, London, 1986, 
 Crown of Thorns by Stephane Groueff, Lanham MD., and London, 1987, 
 The Daily Telegraph, Obituary for "HM Queen Ioanna of the Bulgarians", London, 28 February 2000.

References

1907 births
2000 deaths
House of Saxe-Coburg and Gotha (Bulgaria)
Italian princesses
Princesses of Savoy
Bulgarian consorts
Queen mothers
Knights Grand Cross of the Order of Saints Maurice and Lazarus
Knights of Malta
Grand Crosses of the Order of St. Sava
Italian Roman Catholics
Bulgarian Roman Catholics
Nobility from Rome
Italian people of Montenegrin descent
Italian exiles
Daughters of emperors
Daughters of kings